The discography of British musician and YouTuber Alex Day consists of seven studio albums, three extended plays, five singles and seven music videos.

Albums

Studio albums

Extended plays

Singles

with Chameleon Circuit

with Sons of Admirals

Other appearances

As producer

Music videos

References

Discographies of British artists
Pop music discographies